is a French-Japanese designer of furniture, textiles, clothing and interiors. He is the founder of the company Gener8 Inc. (genereight).

Early life
Tsunashima studied in secondary school at the St. Mary's International School in Tokyo, Japan. He received a Bachelor of Fine Arts in Industrial Design in 1997 and a Master of Fine Arts in Textiles in 2000 from the Rhode Island School of Design.

Career
Tsunashima began his career as a designer for Issey Miyake and Knoll, Inc. In 2006, Tsunashima founded the craft and design company genereight in Sumida, Tokyo, for which he serves as furniture maker (primarily in bamboo) and oversees all aspects of product design. He currently teaches the courses FUTURE CRAFT at the Tama Art University in Tokyo, in partnership with the ArtCenter College of Design in Pasadena, California. He is a co-instructor of the schools' Pacific Rim project, an international collaborative research effort culminating in public exhibits.

References

External links
 Genereight company website

Living people
Industrial designers
Product designers
Japanese fashion designers
Japanese people of French descent
Rhode Island School of Design alumni
1974 births